The Rural Municipality of Perdue No. 346 is a rural municipality (RM) in the Canadian province of Saskatchewan within Census Division No. 12 and  Division No. 5.

History 
The RM of Perdue No. 346 incorporated as a rural municipality on December 13, 1909.

Geography

Communities and localities 
The following urban municipalities are surrounded by the RM.

Villages
 Perdue
 Kinley

The following unincorporated communities are within the RM.

Localities
 Feudal
 Catherwood
 Juniata
 Keppel
 Leney (dissolved as a village, December 31, 1971)

Demographics 

Government 
The RM of Perdue No. 346 is governed by an elected municipal council and an appointed administrator that meets on the second Tuesday of every month. The reeve of the RM is John Gray while its administrator is Allan Kirzinger. The RM's office is located in Perdue.

Transportation 
 Saskatchewan Highway 14
 Saskatchewan Highway 655
 Canadian National Railway
 Canadian Pacific Railway

See also 
List of rural municipalities in Saskatchewan

References 

P